"Firebox" is the second single to be released from the Swedish rock band Europe's ninth studio album, Bag of Bones. It was released as a digital download on August 18, 2012.

Music video

The music video was directed by Patric Ullaeus.

Track listing

 "Firebox"

Personnel

Joey Tempest – vocals
John Norum – guitars
John Levén – bass
Mic Michaeli – keyboards
Ian Haugland – drums
Kevin Shirley – producer

References

2012 singles
2012 songs
Europe (band) songs
Song recordings produced by Kevin Shirley
Songs written by Joey Tempest
Songs written by Mic Michaeli
Music videos directed by Patric Ullaeus